The 2015 Fed Cup (also known as the 2015 Fed Cup by BNP Paribas for sponsorship purposes) was the 53rd edition of the most important tournament between national teams in women's tennis. The final took place on 14–15 November and was won by the Czech Republic for the second year in a row, and for the fourth time in five years.

World Group

Seeds

Draw

Final

Czech Republic vs Russia

World Group play-offs 

The four losing teams in the World Group first round ties, and four winners of the World Group II ties entered the draw for the World Group play-offs. Four seeded teams, based on the latest Fed Cup ranking, were drawn against four unseeded teams.

Date: 18–19 April

  remained in the World Group in 2016.
  remained in World Group II in 2016.

World Group II 

The World Group II was the second highest level of Fed Cup competition in 2015. Winners advanced to the World Group play-offs, and losers played in the World Group II play-offs.

Seeds
{{columns-list|colwidth=30em|
  (World Group II play-off)
  (World Group II play-off)
  (World Group II play-off)
 ' (World Group play-off) }}
Date: 7–8 February

 World Group II play-offs 

The four losing teams from World Group II played off against qualifiers from Zonal Group I. Two teams qualified from Europe/Africa Zone, one team from the Asia/Oceania Zone, and one team from the Americas Zone.

Date: 18–19 April

  and  remained in World Group II in 2016.
  and  remained in Zonal Group I in 2016.

 Americas Zone 

 Group I 
Venue: La Loma Sports Centre, San Luis Potosí, Mexico (outdoor hard)

Dates: 4–7 February

Participating teams

Pool A
 
 
 

Pool B
 
 
  

 Play-offs 

  advanced to World Group II play-offs

 Group II 
Venue: Centro Nacional de Tenis, Santo Domingo Este, Dominican Republic (outdoor hard)
 Dates: 24–27 June

Participating teams

Pool A
 
  

Pool B
 
 
 

Pool C
 
 
 Pool D
 
 
 

 Play-offs 

 Asia/Oceania Zone 

 Group I 
Venue: Guangdong Olympic Tennis Centre, Guangzhou, China (outdoor hard)

Dates: 4–7 February

Participating teams

Pool A
   
 

Pool B
 
 
 
 

 Play-offs 

  advanced to World Group II play-offs
  was relegated to Asia/Oceania Zone Group II in 2016

 Group II 
Venue: SAAP Tennis Complex, Hyderabad, India (outdoor hard)

Dates: 14–18 April

Participating teams

Pool A
 
 

Pool B
 
 
 

Pool C
  
 

Pool D
 
 
 Pacific Oceania

 Play-offs 

  was promoted to Asia/Oceania Zone Group I in 2016.

 Europe/Africa Zone 

 Group I 
Venue: Syma Sport and Events Centre, Budapest, Hungary (indoor hard)

Dates: 4–7 February

Participating teams

 Pool A 
 
 
  Pool B 
 
 
 
 

 Pool C 
  
 
 

 Pool D 
 
 
 
 

 Play-offs 

  and  advanced to World Group II play-offs

 Group II 
Venue: Tere Tenniscentre, Tallinn, Estonia (indoor hard)

Dates: 4–7 February

Participating teams

Pool A
 
  
 Pool B
 
 
 
 

 Play-offs 

 Group III 
Venue: Bellevue, Ulcinj, Montenegro (outdoor clay)

Dates: 13–18 April

Participating teams

 Pool A 
  
 

 Pool B 
 
 
 

 Pool C 
  
 

 Pool D 
 
 
 
 

 Play-offs 

  and ''' were promoted to Europe/Africa Zone Group II in 2016

References

External links 
 fedcup.com

 
2015 in tennis
2015
2015 in women's tennis